The 5th Mechanized Division is a division of the Syrian Arab Army.

Combat history

Black September in Jordan

The 5th Division, at that time an infantry formation, invaded Jordan during the events of Black September in Jordan, 1970. It was reinforced with two armoured brigades. After an ineffectual defence by the massively outnumbered Jordanian 40th Armoured Brigade, the 5th Division's attack was repelled with heavy losses on 22 September 1970 mostly through the efforts of the Royal Jordanian Air Force.

Yom Kippur War

The 5th Division also saw action on the Golan Heights during the Yom Kippur War, being deployed alongside the 1st, 3rd, 7th, and 9th divisions. The 5th Division, under the command of Brig. Gen. Ali Aslan, was responsible for the front south and east of Rafid, and north of the Yarmouk Valley. Although designated as an infantry division, it was actually a mechanized division. The 5th Division was the only deployed division which had its full complement of armoured and mechanised vehicles, with some 10,000 men, 200 tanks, 72 artillery pieces, and an equal number of anti-aircraft weapons.

Syrian civil war

Prior to 2011 the division seems to have been part of the 1st Corps (Syria). Commenting on events during the April–May 2011 Daraa siege, Henry Boyd of the International Institute for Strategic Studies noted that "the locally based 5th Armoured Division was supplemented by a brigade of the 4th Armoured Division under the command of Bashar’s brother Maher al-Assad."

Izra is base to the 5th Division's 12th Armoured Brigade and 175th Artillery Regiment. The 12th Armoured Brigade has been reported as taking part in the Siege of Menagh Air Base, near the Turkish border.

On 9 November 2014, during the First Battle of Al-Shaykh Maskin, rebels captured the al-Hesh northern and southern hills, the Army training ground, al-Rahba battalion base, "al-Konkors" battalion base, the medical base, "al-Hejajia" tanks battalion base and Hawi checkpoint around the city of Nawa. Later that day, according to the Syrian Observatory for Human Rights (SOHR), rebels took control over the entire city after the Army retreated towards Brigade 112 HQ base (located between the two towns) as well as Shaykh Maskin. Brigade 112 HQ was eventually captured by the rebels according to two Arab news agencies. Both local rebel groups and the al-Nusra Front claimed credit for the opposition advance. Syrian state broadcaster SANA said troops were "redeploying and reorganizing in the Nawa area... in order to prepare for upcoming fighting." At the end of the day, SOHR reported, the Army advanced inside Shaykh Maskin. As of 10 November, according to a military source cited by pro-government media, the Army was still present in the South and East Districts of Shaykh Maskin, and reportedly cleared the two besieged areas surrounding base 82 and Brigade 112. The next day, rebels advanced in Shaykh Maskin and took control of new positions and eventually captured the eastern neighborhood on 12 November.

References

Bibliography

Further reading
 

Armoured divisions of Syria